Charles James (1882–1960) was an English footballer who played for Stoke.

Career
James was born in Stoke-upon-Trent and played for amateur side Halmerend before joining Stoke in 1908. He became a bit-part player for Stoke in this three seasons there making a modest 13 appearances. He later worked at the Florence Colliery and also played for the works football team.

Career statistics

References

English footballers
Stoke City F.C. players
1882 births
1960 deaths
Association football defenders